Prior to its uniform adoption of proportional representation in 1999, the United Kingdom used first-past-the-post for the European elections in England, Scotland and Wales. The European Parliament constituencies used under that system were smaller than the later regional constituencies and only had one Member of the European Parliament each.

Created for the 1979 European Parliament elections in 1979, Lancashire Central was a single-member constituency formed from the grouping of numerous neighbouring UK Parliament constituencies.

Boundaries
1979–1984: Blackpool North, Blackpool South, Chorley, Fylde South, Preston North, Preston South, Westhoughton, Wigan
1984–1994: Blackpool North, Blackpool South, Chorley, Fylde, Preston, Ribble Valley, South Ribble, West Lancashire
1994–1999: Blackpool North, Blackpool South, Burnley, Fylde, Pendle, Preston, Ribble Valley, Wyre

Members of the European Parliament

Election results

References

External links
 David Boothroyd's United Kingdom Election Results

European Parliament constituencies in England (1979–1999)
Politics of Lancashire
1979 establishments in England
1999 disestablishments in England
Constituencies established in 1979
Constituencies disestablished in 1999